The 2009 Bulgarian Supercup was the seventh Bulgarian Supercup match, a football match which was contested between the 2008–09 A Professional Football Group champion, Levski Sofia, and the 2008–09 Bulgarian Cup holder, Litex Lovech. The match was held on 1 August 2009 at the Vasil Levski National Stadium in Sofia, Bulgaria. Levski beat Litex 1–0 thanks to a second-half goal from Frenchman Cédric Bardon to win their third Bulgarian Supercup.

Match details

References 

Bulgarian Supercup
PFC Levski Sofia matches
PFC Litex Lovech matches
Supercup